Evergestis hyrcanalis is a moth in the family Crambidae. It was described by Hans Georg Amsel in 1961. It is found in Iran.

References

Evergestis
Moths described in 1961
Moths of Asia